Rhino Rangers Football Club is a football club based in Tabora, Tanzania. They previously played in the top level of Tanzanian professional football, the Tanzanian Premier League. The 2015/16 season they are competing in the Tanzanian First Division League.

External links
Team profile – soccerway.com
Club logo

Football clubs in Tanzania
Tanga, Tanzania